St. David's Church and Cemetery is a historic church and cemetery on Church Street in Cheraw, South Carolina.

It was built in 1770 and added to the National Register in 1971.

Notable Burials
 Alexander Gregg (1819–1893), a native of this area and the first bishop of Texas and author of History of the Old Cheraws.
 James McCutchen McJames (1873–1901), early professional baseball player.
 William P. Pollock (1870–1922), member of the S. C. General Assembly and U. S. Senator from South Carolina
 Capt. Moses Rogers (d. Nov. 11, 1821) commanded the SS Savannah on its 1819 voyage when it became the first steamship to cross the Atlantic Ocean.
 William Francis Stevenson (1861–1942) U.S. Representative from South Carolina.

References

External links

 Saint David's Church and Cemetery, Chesterfield County (Church St., Cheraw) Photographs from the South Carolina Department of Archives and History website
 Payne's Adventures, August 4, 2012——Blog with photographs of St. David's and other Cheraw sights
 Old St. David's Historical Marker Database
 St. David's Church, Cheraw, Searching the South——one-half (½) of Laurence Prince (1920–2004) is at St. David's and the other is in Virginia

Churches on the National Register of Historic Places in South Carolina
Churches completed in 1770
Anglican churches in South Carolina
Anglican cemeteries in the United States
Buildings and structures in Chesterfield County, South Carolina
18th-century Episcopal church buildings
Colonial South Carolina
English-American culture in South Carolina
National Register of Historic Places in Chesterfield County, South Carolina
1770 establishments in South Carolina